Everett Bradley may refer to:

Everett Bradley (athlete) (1897–1969), American pentathlete and Olympic medalist
Everett Bradley (musician), American multi-instrumentalist